Sienkiewicza Street is a long thoroughfare laid in the mid-1860s in downtown Bydgoszcz. Its frontage carries several tenements which have kept their original architectural features and their historical importance.

Location
The lane runs on an approximate north-south path in the west of downtown district. Stemming in the south from Dworcowa Street, its course crosses numerous other streets on the route: Podolska, Zduny, Lipowa, Śniadeckich, Chrobrego, Kwiatowa, Mazowiecka, Hetmańska and ends at Bocianowo street.

History 
The first documents referring to Mittelstraße date back to 1869, as an address book registers some practitioners in this lane.
Furthermore, the following issues (1872, 1876) list the houses in the street, i.e. 14 dwellings.

The street appears on map of Bromberg dated 1876, but its northern part is not completed, being laid in the Brenkenhof district (today's Bocianowo).

During its existence, the thoroughfare bore the following names:
 till 1920, Mittelstraße (Middle street);
 1920-1939, Ulica Henryka Sienkiewicza;
 1939-1945, Fischerstraße;
 Since 1945, Ulica Henryka Sienkiewicza.

The current name refers to Henryk Adam Aleksander Pius Sienkiewicz (1846-1916), a famous Polish journalist, novelist and Nobel Prize laureate in 1905.

Within time, the house numbering in the street evolved, either to account for the extension of the axis (in the mid-1880s and in 1900) or adapt the horse shoe system to the Polish rule (in 1920).

Main areas and edifices

Tenement at 48 Dworcowa Street, corner with Sienkiewicza street
1875-1900

Eclecticism

Bahnhoffstraße 74 has been built in the early 1880s for Rob. Tuchscher, a pharmacist. He opened there his pharmacy, Kronen Apotheke, one of the few in the city at the time. A new pharmacist, Emil Affeldt, took over the firm at the same place from 1900 till the end of the 1920s.

Beautifully restored in 2018, the corner tenement displays two symmetric facades with a neo-classic style and a wrought iron balcony on its corner.

Tenement at 50 Dworcowa Street, corner with Sienkiewicza street
1895

Neo-Renaissance

Christian Teodor Hinß has been running there a coach workshop since 1880. His widow Minna lived there till the outbreak of WWI.

Facades display a northern Neo-Renaissance style with elaborate ornament and scrollwork (on pediments, cartouches), balustrades, pinnacles, together with stone blocks imitation, bay windows and a mansard roof.

Tenement at 1
1912

Art Nouveau

The tenement, erected in 1890, has been revamped in the early 1910s. At that time, Minna Hinß, widow of Teodor, living at corner with Dworcowa (then Banhoffstraße), was the landlord.

Renovated in 2017, the facade displays some Art Nouveau motifs, such as a mascaron on the lintel of  a first floor window. In addition, preserved elements are visible on the ground floor, where both carved wooden doors exhibit transom light, adorned in one case with stained glass.

Building at 3
1885

Warehouse

The edifice has been used for storage purposes, in particular after 1920, when it served as a granary for the firm "RAWA" till the start of WWII.
Today, it houses a shop of metal and non metal tools.

Tenement at 4
1910

Early Modern architecture

After a long period during which the plot stayed as a garden, the tenement was commissioned by Eugen Steinborn, a master locksmith.

From 1920 to 1929, the site housed a joint US-Polish company, AMPOL, producing incandescent light bulbs. The firm had been established by Polish emigrants in the USA, Stefan Daszewski and Rafał Kukliński.

Plot at 5
1870s

This plot is one of the first where has been erected an edifice in the early 1870s. For several decades till the outbreak of the First World War, at this address (then 3 Mittelstraße) stood a furniture factory established by Julius Grünenwald. In the 1960s and 1970s, the area hosted a pharmaceutic drug factory.

Tenement at 6, corner with Podolska street
1900s

Eclecticism

Carl Schultz, the first owner, had been running a restaurant there till the beginning of the 1930s.

The deteriorated building still displays beautifully adorned openings: decorated window sills, lesenes on the sides and garnished lintels as well as transom lighted entrance doors. Both facades yet possess empty niches where once stood statues.

Tenements at 7/7a
1880s and 1900

Eclecticism

The first building erected in the early 1880s was registered with only one street number. At the time, the landlord was Hermann Klessen (or Kleßen).

At he turn of the 20th century, the plot was recorded as two separate houses, "4 and 4a Mittelstraße": they had the same owner, Carl Kästner, a railway administrative assistant, inhabiting at 4a (present day 7a).

As far as frontages are concerned, 7a building kept nicer architectural motifs than its neighbour (floral design cartouches and adorned lintel). The house at 7, however, still boasts an original  wrought iron fencing and a wood awning at the side entrance.

Tenement at 9
1890s

Eclecticism

This house and the neighbouring one at 11 were owned by Amalie Grundtmann, a rentier. She is listed as owner of this building till the end of the 19th century.

The building has been renovated in 2020.

Tenement at 10, corner with Zduny street
1910

Early Modern architecture, German Historicism

The previous edifice from the 19th century has been rebuilt in the early 1910s, with a new owner, Franz Salewski, a plumber.

The tenement presents some hints of historicist style, especially in the round shaped bay windows one can notice on both facades combined with the upper wooden loggia on Zduny frontage.

Building at 10a, corner with Zduny street
Post WWII

This area have been unbuilt during most of the period of the development of the street. Registered at "62 Mittelstraße", it has been mentioned during the interwar as a "building site", before hosting a wine shop. In the 1960s, a confectionery, MALTA, was set up there, replaced after 1995, by a clothing shop. 
Today, the site welcomes a bakery run by Rafał Przybylski.

The plot preserved its tall workshop chimney in the backyard.

Grundtmann's tenement at 11, corner with Lipowa street
1890s

Eclecticism

This building had for initial landlord Emmy Grundtmann, a rentier. She also owned the neighbouring one at 9. 
Emmy Grundtmann, née Hempel, was living at the time at "56 Wilhemstraße" (today nonexistent, at the corner of Jagiellońska and Bernardyńska streets). At the turn of the 20th century, the tenement was purchased by Albin Cohnfeld, sitting at "22 Bahoffstraße" (50 Dworcowa Street). In the aftermath of the WWI, the building sheltered orphan boys (grades I, II and III) from the Eastern Borderlands, while older students where housed at 20 Gdańska street. The children were all gathered in March 1921 to the city orphanage at 32 Chodkiewicza street.

Deftly restored, the tenement exhibits bossage design, a double frieze running on both frontages, pediments on second floor windows and lesenes flanking openings on the upper floor. Finally, one can appreciate a series of eaves on the top levels, as well as a super wrought iron  entrance door featuring rosettes, flowers and a dragon-shaped handle.

Kayser's villa at 12
1860s

Eclecticism

This house is one of the first edifice built in the street. Then located at "61 Mittelstraße", it was the property of Robert Kayser, a paymaster. The villa changed four times of address through time, thanks to the successive house numbering rules from its erection till the Second World War.

The façade is unfortunately not well preserved. One can appreciate, however, the quality of the original wrought iron fencing, portraying curved and floral motifs.

Tenement at 13, corner with Lipowa street
1883

Eclecticism

Nr.13, like Nr.15, belonged initially to the same person, Wilhelm Schmidt, a restaurateur at "12 Wilhelmstraße" (16 Focha street). At the start of the 20th century, he moved to live there, as a rentier, till the late 1920s.

Thoroughly refurbished in 2020, the building displays a plethora of architectural details, among others: an adorned corner bay window  supported by stucco crafted corbels, round pediments with stuccoed motifs, a transom stained glass window above the entrance door or a wooden corbel table topping both elevations.

Tenement at 14
1890s

Eclecticism

The tenement was commissioned by Gustav Röscke, a baker, living at "88 Bahnoffstraße" (today's 18 Dworcowa Street).

One can highlight the following decoration elements on the main elevation of the second and third floor: pilasters with Corinthian order capitals, delicately crafted plastered corbels and corbel tables.

Tenement at 15
1890s

Eclecticism

Nr.15, like Nr.13, belonged initially to the same person, Wilhelm Schmidt, a restaurateur at "12 Wilhelmstraße" (16 Focha street). In 1900, it changed hands: Gustav Schmidt became its owner. A restaurateur too, he lived at nearby "18 Elisabethstaße" (35 Śniadeckich street).

Renovated in the late 2010s, the facade offers beautiful plastered pediments above the openings and corbel tables beneath the eaves.

ßausebad tenement at 16
1870

Eclecticism

Akin to Nr.12, this building has been erected in the early days of the street, registered as "22 Mittelstraße". It was then possessed by a master bookbinder, Otto ßausebad. In 1900, this address changed to "57 Mittelstraße" with the same owner.

Refitted in the 2010s, the Mansard roofed tenement displays architectural details, notably stuccoed cartouches as well as embellished window framing (lintel, pediments).

Tenement at 17
1879, by Anton Hoffmann

Eclecticism

Successive landlords were the Schmidts, Wilhelm then Gustav, both restaurateurs.

The initial design is the work of the local architect Anton Hoffmann, father-in-law of another building designer in the city, Józef Święcicki.

Tenement at 35 Śniadeckich street, corner with Sienkiewicza street
1894

Eclecticism

First landlord of the building at then Elisabethstraße 18 was Gustav Schmidt, a restaurateur, who lived there until the beginning of World War I. He was also the owner of the building at Nr.15.

The tenement is particularly noticeable by its grand bay window overhanging the corner: first floor is adorned with columns, rosettes on the lintel and a triangular pediment, second displays pilasters crowned by a tented roof. The facade on Śniadecki Street is ornamented likewise, in addition to two large wrought iron balconies.

Max Schmidt tenement at 42 Śniadeckich street, corner Sienkiewicza
1882–1883, by Józef Święcicki and Anton Hoffmann

Neo-Renaissance

The building, then at Elisabethstraße 42a, was a commission from Max Schmidt, a teacher. It is one of the first realizations of Józef Święcicki together with his stepfather, Anton Hoffman, a master bricklayer.

Recently renovated, the elevation boasts neo-Renaissance forms inspired by the Italian Cinquecento: bossages and simplicity of motifs renders perfectly the symmetry of this house. In the corner giving onto both streets, a remarkable bay window on two levels, flanked at each floor by lean columns emphasizes this portion of the facade. In his next realizations, Józef Święcicki will elaborate further on his architectural style, adding more details and features, like building at Tenement at Freedom Square 1 (1896) or at 1/3 Stary Port (1893-1905).

Tenement at 17a
1892

Eclecticism

This small building appears under construction in 1892, then under different numberings (10, 10a or 11) in Mittelstraße. His first landlord was Max Schmidt, a teacher, living at "43 Elisabethstraße" (40 Śniadeckich street, nonexistent).

Wedged between two large tenements, this one-storey building displays anyhow plastered motifs, bossages, corbel tables and an  imposing wrought iron grille.

Tenement at 18
1887-188

Eclecticism

The first owner is registered as Constantia Bordanowicz, married to a butcher. At its erection, the address was "34a Mittelstraße".

On the renovated elevation, one can highlight the large wooden door, pedimented openings with stuccoed cartouches beneath and corbel tables.

Tenement at 19
1890s

Eclecticism

Max Schmidt, a teacher living at "43 Elisabethstraße" (40 Śniadeckich street, nonexistent) did not only own the building at 17a, but also this one.

The elevation, marked by time, still exhibits its former painted numbering, 11a. One can make out pediments and a few lesenes flanking the windows.

Tenement at 21
1860s

Eclecticism

August Kapelski, a shoemaker, was the first owner of this tenement, then at "8 Mittelstraße". This building is the oldest one registered in the street, end of the 1860s.

The refurbished facade teems with architectural details, as is fit for an eclectic house: especially with the presence of stuccoed festoons on the window sills or on the lintels, pilasters or motifs on the lesenes of the last floor.

Tenement at 23, corner with Chrobrego street
1890s, by H. Brennecke

Neo-Renaissance

Teophil Tucholski, a locomotive driver, was the landlord at the construction of the building.

Nicely decorated  cartouches are noticeable on the first floor of both facades.

August Jordan tenement at 24, corner with 18 Chrobrego street
Registered on Kuyavian-Pomeranian Voivodeship heritage list, Nr.787208, A/1626 issued on February 6, 2013

1891-1892

Eclecticism

The commissioner was August Jordan, a raft builder. He lived there till the start of the 20th century.

The building, renovated in 2019, is remarkable by its mix of plain brick and bossage elements. Furthermore, all the windows on the first floor have pediments while the last storey displays floral decoration in cartouches.

Tenement at 20 Chrobrego street, corner with Sienkiewicza street
1895-1896

Eclecticism

Carl Juncker, a rentier, was listed as the first landlord of this corner building.

Nicely revamped in 2020, features now include a corner pediment with an adorned tympanum, various other pediments, balustrades, festoons and two superb balconies on Sienkiewicza street.

Tenement at 29
1875-1900

Eclecticism

The tenement then at "16 Mittelstraße" was first owned by Franz Kretschmer, living at "3 Gammstraße" (now 5 Warmińskiego street).

The facade has lost most of its ornamention.

Donovang tenement at 30
1911-1912, by Georg Baesler

Art Nouveau, Landhaus architecture

Benno Donovang was an administrative agent and first owner of this tenement at "49/50 Mittelstraße".

The ornamention of the facade displays late Art Nouveau-early modernism characteristics: on the one hand a carved entrance door with a transom light, a cartouche with floral motifs, on the other hand the use of geometric shapes and long vertical lines.

Building at 31
1875-1900

Eclecticism, German Historicism

The initial landlord was August Dräger, a locksmith.

The tenement draws attention among the neighbouring facades by the choice of its shape and its decoration. The grand avant-corps housing the loggia-entrance with its vaulted shapes is the first highlight. Looking closely, one can also make out on the sides a fine ornamentation of the window lintels and the finials topping the wall gable above the avant-corps.

Tenement at 17 Kwiatowa street, corner with Sienkiewicza street
1911-1912

Art Nouveau, early Modern architecture

The commissioner of this building was Anton Grabowski, a master metalworker, living at "14 Blumenstraße" (today's 2 Kwiatowa street, house nonexistent).

Renovated in 2020, one can appreciate in particular the bartizan overhanging at the corner, the bay windows and the numerous stuccoed motifs present in cartouches or on vertical friezes.

Building at 32, corner with Kwiatowa street
1883

Eclecticism

The first landlord is identified as Rudolf Duda, working in the railway business. The plot changed four times its house numbering: "25 Mittelstraße" (1885), "28 Mittelstraße" (1900), "48 Mittelstraße" (1915) and today's "32 Sienkiewicza street".

The refurbishment completed in 2020 salvaged the elevation which was in a bad technical condition.Furthermore, the facade probably lost its architectural details in the course of earlier works.

Building at 33
1890s

Eclecticism

The building was commissioned by Reinhold Wollenberg, working in the trade of timber.

Refit in 2020, the facade exhibits a classical style, reinforced by the presence of two large balconies at each storey over the entrance.

Building at 35
1890s

Eclecticism

The building at then "19 Mittelstraße" was the propriety of a telegraph assistant, Hermann Thomas.

The facade offers the originality to fit exactly the curve of the street, i.e. one can discover two elevations, presenting the same eclectic features.

Building at 36
1890

Eclecticism

Registered in 1890 at "26 Mittelstraße", the owner was listed as Mrs Stepanski or Szczepanski, a widow.

The plain brick elevation on the street has kept many original details, from the mascaron above the entrance to the stucco-adorned openings or the decorated cartouches.

Friedrich Lork tenement at 37
1880s

Eclecticism

Friedrich Lork was renting rooms in this building. Its family kept ownership of this tenement till the start of the second world war.

Similar to the building at Nr.35, the facade draws specific attention thanks to its portal, topped by a decorated oeil-de-boeuf.

Building at 38, corner with 17 Mazowiecka street
1890s

Eclecticism

Marian Rudnicki, a merchant, was the commissioner of this tenement. The latter bore different house numberings: "25 Mittelstraße" in the 1890s, "45 Mittelstraße" (1915) and current "38 Sienkiewicza street".

The corner building, in need of restoration, still possesses a nice entrance door decoration, with pilasters flanking the side and a triangular pediment filled with plastered floral motifs and a smiling figure head. This ensemble is replicated on the door opening on Mazowiecka street.

Building at 40, corner with Mazowiecka street
1890

Eclecticism

Carl Heller, a butcher, was the registered landlord of this tenement at its construction.

The house, renovated in the 2010s, exhibits a nice balcony on the corner narrow facade. One can notice as well the stucooed corbels on the window lintel and the corbel table running beneath the roof.

Building at 41, corner with 19 Mazowiecka street
1885

Eclecticism

Hugo Hecht, a merchant, was the commissioner of this house. He was an important investor in the city: at the end of the 19th century, in addition to this tenement, he owned three other buildings in Gdańska Street, at 88/90, 92/94 and 96. Hecht was living at "30 Wilhelmstraße" (nonexistent today, in Jagiellońska street).

The renovation carried out in 2020 underlines the richness of the facade. The storeys are separated by cornices, the roof is supported by consoles and pediments are incorporated above the windows. Massive balconies are decorated with balustrades and the side garage entrance displays a large wrought iron fence.

Tenement at 42, corner with Hetmańska street
1915

Early Modern architecture

The building was a commission from the Housing association of Bromberg, a pioneering cooperative established in 1890. At the re-creation of the Polish state, the German association was transferred to the Polish authorities under the calling "Bydgoszcz housing Cooperative". The flats owned by BSM were spread all over the city in particular at Chrobrego, Mazowiecka, Hetmańska streets, 13-15 Cieszkowskiego street, 26-28 Garbary Street, 1 Kołłątaja street, 13-17 Krasińskiego street, 2 Szwalbego street, 31-33 and 39-51 Pomorska street or 3-7 Staszica street. At 42 Sienkiewicza, a dozen of tenants were living there.

The building's elongated lines, with very few concessions to decoration (except for the wall dormers and the street door) reflect the principles of the then nascent modernism movement.

Tenement at 44, corner with 16 Hetmańska street
1878, by Anton Hoffmann

Eclecticism

Carl Heller, a butcher, owner at Nr.40, also possessed this building. At his death, his widow Caroline took over the ownership till the turn of the 20th century.

The initial design is the work of the local architect Anton Hoffmann, designer of other buildings in this street.

This previous plot (Nr.44) marks the farthest development of "Mittelstraße" in the 19th century. The vast majority of the allotments located north of Hetmańska street (then Luisen straße) have been developed from 1900 onwards. As such, many buildings have been commissioned by investors, sometimes in batches.

Tenement at 45
1890s

Eclecticism

The investor in this realization was Benjamin Neumann, a trader in flour. He lived at "2 Wörth-straße" (present day Racławicka street).

The elevation on the street displays typical eclectic features.

Tenement at 47
1900

Art Nouveau, early modern architecture

The first landlord is listed as Julius Scröder, a trader in flour.

Lean lines define the facade, balanced by the presence of two avant-corps. The entrance portal is flanked by two columns and a pediment. Art Nouveau elements are still visible in the decoration, with a waving line running along the elevation and with the floral stuccoed adornment of the lintels.

Franz Bogusławski house at 48
1900

Eclecticism

Bogusławski was a mason by trade. He lived there till 1939.

The one-storey house reveals its old character. The building must have been re-constructed from a more ancient one, hence keeping its initial features. Albeit, the facade reflects interesting details, especially in the delicate ornamentation of the pediment above the entrance door.

Tenement at 49
1900

Eclecticism

A railway locksmith, Lukowicz, living in Charlottenburg, is listed as the owner of this building from its completion till WWII.

The tenement underwent a refurbishment in the first half of 2020. The sturdy shape of the facade is reinforced by the brick-apparent display, the heavy pilasters and the coarse broken pediments. Interestingly, the corbels crowning the frontage present artistic mascarons.

Franz Bogusławski tenement at 50
1900

Eclecticism

Bogusławski, living at abutting Nr.48, owned also this building. He had his initial, "B", inscribed in the half-moon pediment in the middle on the facade.

Apart from this anecdotic marking, very few details withstood time. A singular cartouche filled with curved motifs stands above the main entrance.

Gączerzwicz tenements at 53/55/57
Late 1890s, by Anton Hoffmann

Eclecticism

These three buildings have been commissioned and hold by the same investor, Kazimir Gączerzwicz, a shoe maker. He was inhabiting the house at "31 Mittelstraße" (today's 57), but had his business located at "18 Neue Pfarr Straße" (Jezuicka street). The project has been designed by Anton Hoffmann.

All three facades exhibit the same eclectic features: Nr.53 is better preserved, Nr.55 presents an original and narrow carriage passage, and one-storey Nr.57 is much smaller than the others, but one can appreciate some decorative acanthus leaves placed on the brackets adorning the windows.

Wybrański tenements at 56/58
Late 1890s

Eclecticism

Both buildings have been commissioned by Matthaüs Wybrański, working as roofer. He was living at "35 Mittelstraße" (Nr.58) and kept ownership of the houses till the late 1930s.

Both facades exhibit eclectic features.

Hobbergs tenements at 59/61
Late 1890s

Eclecticism

These buildings were the result of the investment of Robert and Wilhelm Hobberg: Robert for Nr.59, Wilhelm for Nr.61. Robert was a food retailer, Wilhelm a master carpenter.

Nr.59 still boasts noticeable architectural details (bossage, pediments, corbels) on its narrow frontage.
The facades at Nr.61, on the corner with Bocianowo street, have unfortunately lost all their decoration.

Tenement at 60
Late 1890s

Eclecticism

This long corner house was first owned by Johann ßalmowski, a baker. Today, a bakery still operates here: it is specialised in potato bread made with rye flour.

See also

 Bydgoszcz
 Polish eastern borderlands
 Anton Hoffmann

References

External links 
 Tool shop at 3
 Bakery at 10a
 Bakery at 60

Bibliography 
  
  

Streets and squares in Bydgoszcz
Cultural heritage monuments in Bydgoszcz
Sienkiewicz Street in Poland